Çəmənli (known as Dilənçilər, Dilanchilar or Dilenchiler until 2009) is a village and municipality in the Barda Rayon of Azerbaijan.  It has a population of 228.

References 

Populated places in Barda District